This is a list of the number-one songs of 2023 in Panama. The charts are published by Monitor Latino, based on airplay across radio stations in Panama using the Radio Tracking Data, LLC in real time, with its chart week running from Monday to Sunday.

In 2023 so far, two songs reached number one in Panama, with both songs being collaborations; a third single, "Quevedo: Bzrp Music Sessions, Vol. 52" by Bizarrap and Quevedo began its run at number one in October 2022. In fact, five acts topped the chart as either lead or featured artists with one—Marc Anthony—achieving their first number-one single in Panama. 

Bizarrap is the second act after Karol G to replace himself at number one in Panama, as his collaboration with Shakira, "Bzrp Music Sessions, Vol. 53" (which debuted at number one) knocked off his collaboration with Quevedo, "Bzrp Music Sessions, Vol. 52". As a result, Bizarrap is the only act to have more than a number-one song so far in 2023, with two.

Chart history

Number-one artists

References 

Panamanian music-related lists
Panama
2021 in Panama